Anna Szántó (born 24 November 1966 in Mátészalka) is a former Hungarian handball player who competed in the 1996 Summer Olympics, where she collected the bronze medal with the Hungarian team. She played four matches and scored seven goals.

References

1966 births
Living people
People from Mátészalka
Hungarian female handball players
Olympic handball players of Hungary
Handball players at the 1996 Summer Olympics
Olympic bronze medalists for Hungary
Olympic medalists in handball
Medalists at the 1996 Summer Olympics
Sportspeople from Szabolcs-Szatmár-Bereg County